Shawn Nadelen (born April 16, 1979) is a retired professional lacrosse player and the current head men's lacrosse coach at Towson University.

He attended Johns Hopkins University where he made two NCAA Tournament Final Four appearances with the Blue Jays as a long stick midfielder.

MLL career
Nadelen was selected by the Bayhawks  as the 15th overall pick in the 2001 MLL Collegiate Draft.  He has played his entire field lacrosse career with Bayhawks organization.  Nadelen helped win two Major League Lacrosse Championships: 2002 and 2005.

He was named to the 2006 MLL All-Star Team.

Nadelen retired in June 2011 after being named the head men's lacrosse coach at Towson University.

NLL career
Nadelen played for the Philadelphia Wings, Minnesota Swarm, and the New Jersey Storm from 2002 until his retirement in 2011.  In 2006, with the Wings  he recorded a total of ten points (3G, 7A) and 53 loose balls in 13 games played. 
 
The Rochester, NY native represented the United States in the 2004 Heritage Cup, an international box lacrosse tournament that takes place every two years, and has been named to Team USA in the 2007 World Indoor Lacrosse Championships.

Coaching career
Nadelen Named Towson University Head Lacrosse Coach Division I lacrosse program.

Since 2005, Nadelen has served on the coaching staff of the Men’s Lacrosse team at Towson University. Nadelen was an Assistant Men’s Lacrosse Coach with the Princeton University Tigers from 2002-2004.

Nadelen's career goal is to be a Head Coach of a Division I lacrosse program.

Statistics

NLL

MLL

References

1979 births
Living people
American lacrosse players
Chesapeake Bayhawks players
Johns Hopkins Blue Jays men's lacrosse players
Major League Lacrosse players
Minnesota Swarm players
People from Henrietta, New York
Philadelphia Wings players
Sportspeople from Rochester, New York